Raúl Cerqueira (born 17 May 1940) is a Portuguese former swimmer. He competed in two events at the 1960 Summer Olympics.

References

1940 births
Living people
Portuguese male swimmers
Olympic swimmers of Portugal
Swimmers at the 1960 Summer Olympics
Sportspeople from Funchal